Khabi, also rendered Kabie (from ), is a Southern Loloish language of Yunnan, China. Kabie is spoken in Jiangcheng Hani and Yi Autonomous County, Mojiang Hani Autonomous County, and Lüchun County.

Khabi word lists transcribed using the Roman-based Hani orthography are provided in Minta (2013) and Luo & Minta (2016).

Distribution
Kabie (Khabi) is spoken in:
Xiqi 西歧村, Sinanjiang Township, Mojiang County, Yunnan, China
Cuoluo, Cuoluo Village, Daheishan Township, Lüchun County, Yunnan, China 绿春县大黑山乡撮芦村撮芦组 (or 撮洛村)
Dadifang, Gejie Village, Jiahe Township, Jiangcheng County, Yunnan, China 江城县加禾乡隔界村大地房
Shipingzhai, Nanwang Village, Jiahe Township, Jiangcheng County, Yunnan, China 江城县加禾乡南旺村石屏寨

References

Luo Jiaxiang [罗家祥]; Minta Minji [敏塔敏吉]. 2012. Hanizu Kabieren wenhua diaocha yu yanjiu [哈尼族卡别人文化调查与研究]. Beijing: Ethnic Publishing House [民族出版社].
Luo Jiaxiang [罗家祥]; Minta Minji [敏塔敏吉]. 2016. Zhongguo Mojiang Hanizu Kabieren wenhua shilu [中国墨江哈尼族卡别人文化实录].  Kunming: Yunnan People's Press [云南人民出版社]. 
Minta Minji [敏塔敏吉]. 2013. Shiguang zhizhong: Mojiang Hani Kabie zhixi wenhua shizheng [时光之中:墨江哈尼族卡别支系文化实证]. Kunming: Yunnan Arts Press [云南美朮出版社]. 
You Weiqiong [尤伟琼]. 2013. Classifying ethnic groups of Yunnan [云南民族识别研究]. Beijing: Nationalities Press [民族出版社].

Southern Loloish languages
Languages of Yunnan